Pascal Robert (born 22 October 1963) is a French former cyclist. He competed in the individual pursuit and team pursuit events at the 1984 Summer Olympics.

References

External links
 

1963 births
Living people
French male cyclists
Olympic cyclists of France
Cyclists at the 1984 Summer Olympics
Sportspeople from Valence, Drôme
French track cyclists
Cyclists from Auvergne-Rhône-Alpes